Hkamti District or Khamti District (sometimes Naga Hills District) is a district in northern Sagaing Division of Burma (Myanmar).  Its administrative center is the town of Singkaling Hkamti.

Townships

The district consists of the two townships:

 Hkamti Township, and
 Homalin Township

Prior to 2010, it additionally controlled Lahe, Lay Shi (Lashe), and Nanyun townships, which were transferred under the 2008 Constitution to the Naga Self-Administered Zone.  The revised smaller district still has a significant minority Naga population.

Borders
Hkamti District is bordered by:
 India to the west
 Naga Self-Administered Zone to the west and north,
 Myitkyina District and Mohnyin District of  Kachin State to the east.
 Katha District to the southeast, and
 Mawlaik District and Tamu District to the south,

Economy
Most people in Hkamti District practice subsistence farming.  There is also a jade mine, although most of the jade mining is nearby in Mohnyin District.

Demographics
The district is inhabited by the Khamti, Duleng (Kachin) and Nung Rawang people.

Notes

External links